Giannis Agtzidis (born 14 October 1992) is a Greek professional footballer who plays as a left-back.

Agtzidis was promoted to the senior Aris team in 2009. Due to his manager's Manuel Machado decision to demote him to the under-20 team, he mutually terminated his contract with the club on 20 January 2012, and eight days later he signed for Doxa Dramas.

References

External links

1992 births
Living people
Aris Thessaloniki F.C. players
Doxa Drama F.C. players
Super League Greece players
Greek footballers
Greece youth international footballers
Footballers from Thessaloniki
Association football fullbacks
Episkopi F.C. players
Apollon Pontou FC players
Agrotikos Asteras F.C. players